Fanshawe is a surname. Notable people with the surname include:

Andy Fanshawe (1963–1992), British mountaineer
Ann Fanshawe (1625–1680), English memoirist
Sir Arthur Fanshawe (1794–1864), British naval officer
Sir Arthur Dalrymple Fanshawe (1847–1936), British naval officer
Catherine Maria Fanshawe (1765–1834), English poet
Charles Fanshawe (c. 1817 – 1901), British military officer, List of British generals and brigadiers
David Fanshawe (1942–2010), English composer
Sir Edward Fanshawe (1814–1906), British naval officer
Sir Edward Fanshawe (British Army officer) (1859–1952) 
Evelyn Fanshawe (1895–1979), in charge of the U.N. relief operation in the British Zone of Germany
Henry Fanshawe (1634–1685), MP for Penryn
James Fanshawe, racehorse trainer
Sir Richard Fanshawe, 1st Baronet (1608–1666), English diplomat to Portugal and Spain
Richard Fanshawe (equestrian) (1906–1988), British Olympian
Robert Fanshawe (Royal Navy officer) (1740–1823), British naval officer and MP for Plymouth
Robert Fanshawe (British Army officer) (1863–1946), British general
Simon Fanshawe (born 1956), English comedian, writer and broadcaster
Edward Fanshawe (British Army officer), (1859–1952) British general
Hew Dalrymple Fanshawe (1860–1957), British general
William Fanshawe, (1583–1634), MP for Lancaster and Clitheroe
Sir Thomas Fanshawe (1580–1631), MP for Bedford and Lancaster
Thomas Fanshawe (of Jenkins) (1607–1651), MP for Preston and Lancaster
Henry Fanshawe (1569–1616), Remembrancer of the Exchequer
Thomas Fanshawe (remembrancer of the exchequer), (1533–1601), Remembrancer of the Exchequer
Thomas Fanshawe, 1st Viscount Fanshawe (1596–1665), Remembrancer of the Exchequer
Thomas Fanshawe, 2nd Viscount Fanshawe (1632–1674), Remembrancer of the Exchequer
Charles Fanshawe, 4th Viscount Fanshawe (1643–1710), MP for Mitchell

Surnames
English-language surnames
Surnames of English origin
Surnames of British Isles origin